Travis George Buck (born November 18, 1983) is an American baseball coach former professional outfielder, who is the current hitting coach for the Arizona State Sun Devils. He played in Major League Baseball (MLB) for the Oakland Athletics, Cleveland Indians and Houston Astros.

College career
Buck attended Richland High School before enrolling at Arizona State University. He played college baseball for the Arizona State Sun Devils baseball team from -. He is eighth in the ASU all-time hits category with 272, and his 110 hits in 2005 are the ninth-most in Sun Devils history. In  and 2005, he was selected as a Pac-10 Conference All-Star outfielder, and in 2004 he helped lead Team USA to a gold medal in the World University Baseball Championship, finishing second on Team USA hitting .412 (28-for-68) with two doubles, two home runs and 14 RBI.  He won the Pac-10 Player-of-the-week award in consecutive weeks in 2004, a feat that was not repeated by a Sun Devil until Ike Davis in 2007.

Professional career

Oakland Athletics

He was selected by the Seattle Mariners in the 23rd round (700th overall) in the 2002 Major League Baseball Draft, but opted not to sign with the Mariners so that he could attend Arizona State University. He was later drafted by the Athletics as the 36th overall selection of the 2005 Major League Baseball Draft.

In , Buck split time between High A (the Stockton Ports) and Double-A (the Midland RockHounds). He finished the year hitting .302 for Midland with four home runs in 212 at-bats. He was selected as an outfielder for the United States in the All-Star Futures Game at PNC Park in Pittsburgh.

He was in the Opening Day lineup for Oakland due to an injury to first baseman Dan Johnson, which prompted manager Bob Geren to shift Nick Swisher to first base and tab Buck as the starting right fielder. Buck went 1-3 in the game, with his first major league hit being a double off Mariners starting pitcher Félix Hernández.

On December 2, 2010, Buck was non-tendered by the Athletics making him a free agent.

Cleveland Indians
On December 20, 2010, Buck signed a minor league deal with the Cleveland Indians. He made their 2011 opening day roster, but was soon sent down to the Triple-A Columbus Clippers when Grady Sizemore was activated from the disabled list. However, when Sizemore returned to the disabled list in mid-May, Buck was recalled.

Buck was designated for assignment on July 28. After the 2011 season, he elected for free agency. On October 6, 2011, Buck elected free agency.

Houston Astros
The Houston Astros signed Buck to a minor league contract on November 9, 2012.

San Diego Padres
Buck played in the San Diego Padres organization in 2013. He became a free agent after the 2014 season.

Coaching career
After ending his playing career, Buck opened a baseball training facility in Richland, Washington called TBuck Training. Buck was named the Boise State University Baseball director of player development and bench coach on August 20, 2018. On July 5, 2021, Buck joined the Arizona State staff as hitting coach.

References

External links

1983 births
Living people
People from Richland, Washington
American expatriate baseball players in Canada
Baseball coaches from Washington (state)
Baseball players from Washington (state)
Major League Baseball outfielders
Oakland Athletics players
Cleveland Indians players
Houston Astros players
Arizona State Sun Devils baseball players
Vancouver Canadians players
Kane County Cougars players
Stockton Ports players
Midland RockHounds players
Sacramento River Cats players
Arizona League Athletics players
Columbus Clippers players
Corpus Christi Hooks players
Oklahoma City RedHawks players
Tucson Padres players
El Paso Chihuahuas players
Boise State Broncos baseball coaches
Arizona State Sun Devils baseball coaches